Il carabiniere a cavallo is a 1962 Italian comedy film directed by Carlo Lizzani.

Plot
A couple of women nomads in Rome steal a horse named Rutilio. The horse belongs to a mounted carabiniere, a member of the Italian national police force. The officer must look throughout the capitol on the same day that he is to wed his fianceè Letizia.

Cast 
Peppino De Filippo: Brigadiere Tarquinio
Nino Manfredi: Franco Bartolomucci
Maurizio Arena: Renato
Annette Stroyberg: Letizia, Franco's fianceè
Luciano Salce: prete
Clelia Matania: madre di Letizia
Eubenio Maggi: padre di Letizia
Anthea Nocera: Rita
Guido Celano: padre di Rita
Lamberto Antinori: barbiere
Silvio Anselmo: Lazzaro
Aldo Giuffré: tenente

References

External links

1962 films
Films directed by Carlo Lizzani
Films scored by Carlo Rustichelli
Italian comedy films
Films shot in Rome
Commedia all'italiana
1962 comedy films
1960s Italian films